Legality may refer to:
 Principle of legality
 Legality of anabolic steroids
 Legality of recording by civilians
 Legality of the Vietnam War
 Legality of cannabis by country
 Legality of drugs
 Drug regulation
 Drug legalization

See also
 Legality Movement Party